In mathematics, an integral is the continuous analog of a sum, which is used to calculate areas, volumes, and their generalizations. Integration, the process of computing an integral, is one of the two fundamental operations of calculus, the other being differentiation. Integration started as a method to solve problems in mathematics and physics, such as finding the area under a curve, or determining displacement from velocity. Today integration is used in a wide variety of scientific fields.

The integrals enumerated here are those termed definite integrals, which can be interpreted as the signed area of the region in the plane that is bounded by the graph of a given function between two points in the real line. Conventionally, areas above the horizontal axis of the plane are positive while areas below are negative. Integrals also refer to the concept of an antiderivative, a function whose derivative is the given function. In this case, they are called indefinite integrals. The fundamental theorem of calculus relates definite integrals with differentiation and provides a method to compute the definite integral of a function when its antiderivative is known.

Although methods of calculating areas and volumes dated from ancient Greek mathematics, the principles of integration were formulated independently by Isaac Newton and Gottfried Wilhelm Leibniz in the late 17th century, who thought of the area under a curve as an infinite sum of rectangles of infinitesimal width. Bernhard Riemann later gave a rigorous definition of integrals, which is based on a limiting procedure that approximates the area of a curvilinear region by breaking the region into infinitesimally thin vertical slabs. In the early 20th century, Henri Lebesgue generalized Riemann's formulation by introducing what is now referred to as the Lebesgue integral; it is more robust than Riemann's in the sense that a wider class of functions are Lebesgue-integrable.

Integrals may be generalized depending on the type of the function as well as the domain over which the integration is performed. For example, a line integral is defined for functions of two or more variables, and the interval of integration is replaced by a curve connecting the two endpoints of the interval. In a surface integral, the curve is replaced by a piece of a surface in three-dimensional space.

History

Pre-calculus integration 
The first documented systematic technique capable of determining integrals is the method of exhaustion of the ancient Greek astronomer Eudoxus (ca. 370 BC), which sought to find areas and volumes by breaking them up into an infinite number of divisions for which the area or volume was known. This method was further developed and employed by Archimedes in the 3rd century BC and used to calculate the area of a circle, the surface area and volume of a sphere, area of an ellipse, the area under a parabola, the volume of a segment of a paraboloid of revolution, the volume of a segment of a hyperboloid of revolution, and the area of a spiral.

A similar method was independently developed in China around the 3rd century AD by Liu Hui, who used it to find the area of the circle. This method was later used in the 5th century by Chinese father-and-son mathematicians Zu Chongzhi and Zu Geng to find the volume of a sphere.

In the Middle East, Hasan Ibn al-Haytham, Latinized as Alhazen ( AD) derived a formula for the sum of fourth powers. He used the results to carry out what would now be called an integration of this function, where the formulae for the sums of integral squares and fourth powers allowed him to calculate the volume of a paraboloid.

The next significant advances in integral calculus did not begin to appear until the 17th century. At this time, the work of Cavalieri with his method of Indivisibles, and work by Fermat, began to lay the foundations of modern calculus, with Cavalieri computing the integrals of  up to degree  in Cavalieri's quadrature formula. The case n = −1 required the invention of a function, hyperbolic logarithm, achieved by quadrature of the hyperbola in 1647.

Further steps were made in the early 17th century by Barrow and Torricelli, who provided the first hints of a connection between integration and differentiation. Barrow provided the first proof of the fundamental theorem of calculus.

Leibniz and Newton 
The major advance in integration came in the 17th century with the independent discovery of the fundamental theorem of calculus by Leibniz and Newton. The theorem demonstrates a connection between integration and differentiation. This connection, combined with the comparative ease of differentiation, can be exploited to calculate integrals. In particular, the fundamental theorem of calculus allows one to solve a much broader class of problems. Equal in importance is the comprehensive mathematical framework that both Leibniz and Newton developed. Given the name infinitesimal calculus, it allowed for precise analysis of functions within continuous domains. This framework eventually became modern calculus, whose notation for integrals is drawn directly from the work of Leibniz.

Formalization 
While Newton and Leibniz provided a systematic approach to integration, their work lacked a degree of rigour. Bishop Berkeley memorably attacked the vanishing increments used by Newton, calling them "ghosts of departed quantities". Calculus acquired a firmer footing with the development of limits. Integration was first rigorously formalized, using limits, by Riemann. Although all bounded piecewise continuous functions are Riemann-integrable on a bounded interval, subsequently more general functions were considered—particularly in the context of Fourier analysis—to which Riemann's definition does not apply, and Lebesgue formulated a different definition of integral, founded in measure theory (a subfield of real analysis). Other definitions of integral, extending Riemann's and Lebesgue's approaches, were proposed. These approaches based on the real number system are the ones most common today, but alternative approaches exist, such as a definition of integral as the standard part of an infinite Riemann sum, based on the hyperreal number system.

Historical notation 
The notation for the indefinite integral was introduced by Gottfried Wilhelm Leibniz in 1675. He adapted the integral symbol, ∫, from the letter ſ (long s), standing for summa (written as ſumma; Latin for "sum" or "total"). The modern notation for the definite integral, with limits above and below the integral sign, was first used by Joseph Fourier in Mémoires of the French Academy around 1819–20, reprinted in his book of 1822.

Isaac Newton used a small vertical bar above a variable to indicate integration, or placed the variable inside a box.

First use of the term 
The term was first printed in Latin by Jacob Bernoulli in 1690: "Ergo et horum Integralia aequantur".

Terminology and notation 
In general, the integral of a real-valued function  with respect to a real variable  on an interval  is written as

The integral sign  represents integration. According to the standard ISO 80000-2:2019, the differential symbol should be printed in Roman (upright) style as it is an operator and not a variable.
A function is said to be  if its integral over its domain is finite. If limits are specified, the integral is called a definite integral.

When the limits are omitted, as in

 

the integral is called an indefinite integral, which represents a class of functions (the antiderivative) whose derivative is the integrand. The fundamental theorem of calculus relates the evaluation of definite integrals to indefinite integrals. There are several extensions of the notation for integrals to encompass integration on unbounded domains and/or in multiple dimensions (see later sections of this article).

In advanced settings, it is not uncommon to leave out  when only the simple Riemann integral is being used, or the exact type of integral is immaterial. For instance, one might write  to express the linearity of the integral, a property shared by the Riemann integral and all generalizations thereof.

Interpretations

Integrals appear in many practical situations. For instance, from the length, width and depth of a swimming pool which is rectangular with a flat bottom, one can determine the volume of water it can contain, the area of its surface, and the length of its edge. But if it is oval with a rounded bottom, integrals are required to find exact and rigorous values for these quantities. In each case, one may divide the sought quantity into infinitely many infinitesimal pieces, then sum the pieces to achieve an accurate approximation.

which is larger than the exact value. Alternatively, when replacing these subintervals by ones with the left end height of each piece, the approximation one gets is too low: with twelve such subintervals the approximated area is only 0.6203. However, when the number of pieces increases to infinity, it will reach a limit which is the exact value of the area sought (in this case). One writes

Formal definitions
There are many ways of formally defining an integral, not all of which are equivalent. The differences exist mostly to deal with differing special cases which may not be integrable under other definitions, but also occasionally for pedagogical reasons. The most commonly used definitions are Riemann integrals and Lebesgue integrals.

Riemann integral 

The Riemann integral is defined in terms of Riemann sums of functions with respect to tagged partitions of an interval. A tagged partition of a closed interval  on the real line is a finite sequence

 

A Riemann sum of a function  with respect to such a tagged partition is defined as

 

thus each term of the sum is the area of a rectangle with height equal to the function value at the distinguished point of the given sub-interval, and width the same as the width of sub-interval, . The mesh of such a tagged partition is the width of the largest sub-interval formed by the partition, . The Riemann integral of a function  over the interval  is equal to  if:

 

When the chosen tags give the maximum (respectively, minimum) value of each interval, the Riemann sum becomes an upper (respectively, lower) Darboux sum, suggesting the close connection between the Riemann integral and the Darboux integral.

Lebesgue integral 

It is often of interest, both in theory and applications, to be able to pass to the limit under the integral. For instance, a sequence of functions can frequently be constructed that approximate, in a suitable sense, the solution to a problem. Then the integral of the solution function should be the limit of the integrals of the approximations. However, many functions that can be obtained as limits are not Riemann-integrable, and so such limit theorems do not hold with the Riemann integral. Therefore, it is of great importance to have a definition of the integral that allows a wider class of functions to be integrated.

Such an integral is the Lebesgue integral, that exploits the following fact to enlarge the class of integrable functions: if the values of a function are rearranged over the domain, the integral of a function should remain the same. Thus Henri Lebesgue introduced the integral bearing his name, explaining this integral thus in a letter to Paul Montel:

The definition of the Lebesgue integral thus begins with a measure, μ. In the simplest case, the Lebesgue measure  of an interval  is its width, so that the Lebesgue integral agrees with the (proper) Riemann integral when both exist. In more complicated cases, the sets being measured can be highly fragmented, with no continuity and no resemblance to intervals.

This area is just . Let .

 

where the integral on the right is an ordinary improper Riemann integral ( is a strictly decreasing positive function, and therefore has a well-defined improper Riemann integral). For a suitable class of functions (the measurable functions) this defines the Lebesgue integral.

 

In that case, the integral is, as in the Riemannian case, the difference between the area above the -axis and the area below the -axis:

 

where

Other integrals 
Although the Riemann and Lebesgue integrals are the most widely used definitions of the integral, a number of others exist, including:

 The Darboux integral, which is defined by Darboux sums (restricted Riemann sums) yet is equivalent to the Riemann integral. A function is Darboux-integrable if and only if it is Riemann-integrable. Darboux integrals have the advantage of being easier to define than Riemann integrals.
 The Riemann–Stieltjes integral, an extension of the Riemann integral which integrates with respect to a function as opposed to a variable.
 The Lebesgue–Stieltjes integral, further developed by Johann Radon, which generalizes both the Riemann–Stieltjes and Lebesgue integrals.
 The Daniell integral, which subsumes the Lebesgue integral and Lebesgue–Stieltjes integral without depending on measures.
 The Haar integral, used for integration on locally compact topological groups, introduced by Alfréd Haar in 1933.
 The Henstock–Kurzweil integral, variously defined by Arnaud Denjoy, Oskar Perron, and (most elegantly, as the gauge integral) Jaroslav Kurzweil, and developed by Ralph Henstock.
 The Itô integral and Stratonovich integral, which define integration with respect to semimartingales such as Brownian motion.
 The Young integral, which is a kind of Riemann–Stieltjes integral with respect to certain functions of unbounded variation.
 The rough path integral, which is defined for functions equipped with some additional "rough path" structure and generalizes stochastic integration against both semimartingales and processes such as the fractional Brownian motion.
 The Choquet integral, a subadditive or superadditive integral created by the French mathematician Gustave Choquet in 1953.
 The Bochner integral, an extension of the Lebesgue integral to a more general class of functions, namely, those with a domain that is a Banach space.

Properties

Linearity
The collection of Riemann-integrable functions on a closed interval  forms a vector space under the operations of pointwise addition and multiplication by a scalar, and the operation of integration

 

is a linear functional on this vector space. Thus, the collection of integrable functions is closed under taking linear combinations, and the integral of a linear combination is the linear combination of the integrals:

 

Similarly, the set of real-valued Lebesgue-integrable functions on a given measure space  with measure  is closed under taking linear combinations and hence form a vector space, and the Lebesgue integral

 

is a linear functional on this vector space, so that:

 

More generally, consider the vector space of all measurable functions on a measure space , taking values in a locally compact complete topological vector space  over a locally compact topological field .

 

that is compatible with linear combinations. "finite").

Linearity, together with some natural continuity properties and normalization for a certain class of "simple" functions, may be used to give an alternative definition of the integral. This is the approach of Daniell for the case of real-valued functions on a set , generalized by Nicolas Bourbaki to functions with values in a locally compact topological vector space. See  for an axiomatic characterization of the integral.

Inequalities 
A number of general inequalities hold for Riemann-integrable functions defined on a closed and bounded interval  and can be generalized to other notions of integral (Lebesgue and Daniell).

 Upper and lower bounds.
 Inequalities between functions. In addition, if the inequality between functions is strict, then the inequality between integrals is also strict.
 Subintervals.
 Products and absolute values of functions.
 Hölder's inequality.
 Minkowski inequality.

Conventions 
In this section,  is a real-valued Riemann-integrable function. The integral

 

over an interval  is defined if . This means that the upper and lower sums of the function  are evaluated on a partition  whose values  are increasing. Geometrically, this signifies that integration takes place "left to right", evaluating  within intervals  where an interval with a higher index lies to the right of one with a lower index. Integrals can also be defined if :

With , this implies:

With the first convention, the resulting relation

 

Fundamental theorem of calculus 

The fundamental theorem of calculus is the statement that differentiation and integration are inverse operations: if a continuous function is first integrated and then differentiated, the original function is retrieved. An important consequence, sometimes called the second fundamental theorem of calculus, allows one to compute integrals by using an antiderivative of the function to be integrated.

First theorem 
Let  be a continuous real-valued function defined on a closed interval .

 

 

Second theorem 

 

If  is integrable on  then

Extensions

Improper integrals 

A "proper" Riemann integral assumes the integrand is defined and finite on a closed and bounded interval, bracketed by the limits of integration. An improper integral occurs when one or more of these conditions is not satisfied. In some cases such integrals may be defined by considering the limit of a sequence of proper Riemann integrals on progressively larger intervals.

If the interval is unbounded, for instance at its upper end, then the improper integral is the limit as that endpoint goes to infinity:

 

If the integrand is only defined or finite on a half-open interval, for instance , then again a limit may provide a finite result:

 

In more complicated cases, limits are required at both endpoints, or at interior points.

Multiple integration 

Just as the definite integral of a positive function of one variable represents the area of the region between the graph of the function and the x-axis, the double integral of a positive function of two variables represents the volume of the region between the surface defined by the function and the plane that contains its domain. For example, a function in two dimensions depends on two real variables, x and y, and the integral of a function f over the rectangle R given as the Cartesian product of two intervals  can be written

 

where the differential  indicates that integration is taken with respect to area.

 

This reduces the problem of computing a double integral to computing one-dimensional integrals. Because of this, another notation for the integral over R uses a double integral sign:

 

Integration over more general domains is possible.

Line integrals and surface integrals 

The concept of an integral can be extended to more general domains of integration, such as curved lines and surfaces inside higher-dimensional spaces. Such integrals are known as line integrals and surface integrals respectively. These have important applications in physics, as when dealing with vector fields.

A line integral (sometimes called a path integral) is an integral where the function to be integrated is evaluated along a curve. Various different line integrals are in use. In the case of a closed curve it is also called a contour integral.

The function to be integrated may be a scalar field or a vector field. The value of the line integral is the sum of values of the field at all points on the curve, weighted by some scalar function on the curve (commonly arc length or, for a vector field, the scalar product of the vector field with a differential vector in the curve). This weighting distinguishes the line integral from simpler integrals defined on intervals. Many simple formulas in physics have natural continuous analogs in terms of line integrals; for example, the fact that work is equal to force, multiplied by displacement, may be expressed (in terms of vector quantities) as:

 

This gives the line integral

 

A surface integral generalizes double integrals to integration over a surface (which may be a curved set in space); it can be thought of as the double integral analog of the line integral. The function to be integrated may be a scalar field or a vector field. The value of the surface integral is the sum of the field at all points on the surface. This can be achieved by splitting the surface into surface elements, which provide the partitioning for Riemann sums.

The flux is defined as the quantity of fluid flowing through  in unit amount of time.

 

The fluid flux in this example may be from a physical fluid such as water or air, or from electrical or magnetic flux. Thus surface integrals have applications in physics, particularly with the classical theory of electromagnetism.

Contour integrals 

In complex analysis, the integrand is a complex-valued function of a complex variable  instead of a real function of a real variable . When a complex function is integrated along a curve  in the complex plane, the integral is denoted as follows

 

This is known as a contour integral.

Integrals of differential forms 

A differential form is a mathematical concept in the fields of multivariable calculus, differential topology, and tensors. Differential forms are organized by degree. For example, a one-form is a weighted sum of the differentials of the coordinates, such as:

 

where E, F, G are functions in three dimensions. A differential one-form can be integrated over an oriented path, and the resulting integral is just another way of writing a line integral. Here the basic differentials dx, dy, dz measure infinitesimal oriented lengths parallel to the three coordinate axes.

A differential two-form is a sum of the form

 

Here the basic two-forms  measure oriented areas parallel to the coordinate two-planes. The symbol  denotes the wedge product, which is similar to the cross product in the sense that the wedge product of two forms representing oriented lengths represents an oriented area.

Unlike the cross product, and the three-dimensional vector calculus, the wedge product and the calculus of differential forms makes sense in arbitrary dimension and on more general manifolds (curves, surfaces, and their higher-dimensional analogs). The exterior derivative plays the role of the gradient and curl of vector calculus, and Stokes' theorem simultaneously generalizes the three theorems of vector calculus: the divergence theorem, Green's theorem, and the Kelvin-Stokes theorem.

Summations 

The discrete equivalent of integration is summation. Summations and integrals can be put on the same foundations using the theory of Lebesgue integrals or time-scale calculus.

Functional integrals 

An integration that is performed not over a variable (or, in physics, over a space or time dimension), but over a space of functions, is referred to as a functional integral.

Applications 
Integrals are used extensively in many areas. For example, in probability theory, integrals are used to determine the probability of some random variable falling within a certain range. Moreover, the integral under an entire probability density function must equal 1, which provides a test of whether a function with no negative values could be a density function or not.

Integrals can be used for computing the area of a two-dimensional region that has a curved boundary, as well as computing the volume of a three-dimensional object that has a curved boundary. The area of a two-dimensional region can be calculated using the aforementioned definite integral. The volume of a three-dimensional object such as a disc or washer can be computed by disc integration using the equation for the volume of a cylinder, where  is the radius. For example, in rectilinear motion, the displacement of an object over the time interval  is given by:
 

where  is the velocity expressed as a function of time. The work done by a force  (given as a function of position) from an initial position  to a final position  is:

 

Integrals are also used in thermodynamics, where thermodynamic integration is used to calculate the difference in free energy between two given states.

Computation

Analytical
The most basic technique for computing definite integrals of one real variable is based on the fundamental theorem of calculus. Provided the integrand and integral have no singularities on the path of integration, by the fundamental theorem of calculus,

Sometimes it is necessary to use one of the many techniques that have been developed to evaluate integrals. Most of these techniques rewrite one integral as a different one which is hopefully more tractable. Techniques include integration by substitution, integration by parts, integration by trigonometric substitution, and integration by partial fractions.

Alternative methods exist to compute more complex integrals. Many nonelementary integrals can be expanded in a Taylor series and integrated term by term. Occasionally, the resulting infinite series can be summed analytically. The method of convolution using Meijer G-functions can also be used, assuming that the integrand can be written as a product of Meijer G-functions. There are also many less common ways of calculating definite integrals; for instance, Parseval's identity can be used to transform an integral over a rectangular region into an infinite sum. Occasionally, an integral can be evaluated by a trick; for an example of this, see Gaussian integral.

Computations of volumes of solids of revolution can usually be done with disk integration or shell integration.

Specific results which have been worked out by various techniques are collected in the list of integrals.

Symbolic

Many problems in mathematics, physics, and engineering involve integration where an explicit formula for the integral is desired. Extensive tables of integrals have been compiled and published over the years for this purpose. With the spread of computers, many professionals, educators, and students have turned to computer algebra systems that are specifically designed to perform difficult or tedious tasks, including integration. Symbolic integration has been one of the motivations for the development of the first such systems, like Macsyma and Maple.

A major mathematical difficulty in symbolic integration is that in many cases, a relatively simple function does not have integrals that can be expressed in closed form involving only elementary functions, include rational and exponential functions, logarithm, trigonometric functions and inverse trigonometric functions, and the operations of multiplication and composition. The Risch algorithm provides a general criterion to determine whether the antiderivative of an elementary function is elementary, and to compute it if it is. However, functions with closed expressions of antiderivatives are the exception, and consequently, computerized algebra systems have no hope of being able to find an antiderivative for a randomly constructed elementary function. On the positive side, if the 'building blocks' for antiderivatives are fixed in advance, it may still be possible to decide whether the antiderivative of a given function can be expressed using these blocks and operations of multiplication and composition, and to find the symbolic answer whenever it exists. The Risch algorithm, implemented in Mathematica, Maple and other computer algebra systems, does just that for functions and antiderivatives built from rational functions, radicals, logarithm, and exponential functions.

Some special integrands occur often enough to warrant special study. In particular, it may be useful to have, in the set of antiderivatives, the special functions (like the Legendre functions, the hypergeometric function, the gamma function, the incomplete gamma function and so on). Extending the Risch's algorithm to include such functions is possible but challenging and has been an active research subject.

More recently a new approach has emerged, using D-finite functions, which are the solutions of linear differential equations with polynomial coefficients. Most of the elementary and special functions are D-finite, and the integral of a D-finite function is also a D-finite function. This provides an algorithm to express the antiderivative of a D-finite function as the solution of a differential equation. This theory also allows one to compute the definite integral of a D-function as the sum of a series given by the first coefficients, and provides an algorithm to compute any coefficient.

Numerical

Definite integrals may be approximated using several methods of numerical integration. The rectangle method relies on dividing the region under the function into a series of rectangles corresponding to function values and multiplies by the step width to find the sum. A better approach, the trapezoidal rule, replaces the rectangles used in a Riemann sum with trapezoids. The trapezoidal rule weights the first and last values by one half, then multiplies by the step width to obtain a better approximation. The idea behind the trapezoidal rule, that more accurate approximations to the function yield better approximations to the integral, can be carried further: Simpson's rule approximates the integrand by a piecewise quadratic function.

Riemann sums, the trapezoidal rule, and Simpson's rule are examples of a family of quadrature rules called the Newton–Cotes formulas. The degree  Newton–Cotes quadrature rule approximates the polynomial on each subinterval by a degree  polynomial. This polynomial is chosen to interpolate the values of the function on the interval. Higher degree Newton–Cotes approximations can be more accurate, but they require more function evaluations, and they can suffer from numerical inaccuracy due to Runge's phenomenon. One solution to this problem is Clenshaw–Curtis quadrature, in which the integrand is approximated by expanding it in terms of Chebyshev polynomials.

For each new step size, only half the new function values need to be computed; the others carry over from the previous size. Gaussian quadrature evaluates the function at the roots of a set of orthogonal polynomials.

The computation of higher-dimensional integrals (for example, volume calculations) makes important use of such alternatives as Monte Carlo integration.

Mechanical
The area of an arbitrary two-dimensional shape can be determined using a measuring instrument called planimeter. The volume of irregular objects can be measured with precision by the fluid displaced as the object is submerged.

Geometrical

Area can sometimes be found via geometrical compass-and-straightedge constructions of an equivalent square.

Integration by differentiation
Kempf, Jackson and Morales demonstrated mathematical relations that allow an integral to be calculated by means of differentiation. Their calculus involves the Dirac delta function and the partial derivative operator . This can also be applied to functional integrals, allowing them to be computed by functional differentiation.

Examples

Using the Fundamental Theorem of Calculus 
The fundamental theorem of calculus allows for straightforward calculations of basic functions.

See also

Notes

References

Bibliography 

  
 
 . In particular chapters III and IV.
 
 
 
 
 
 Available in translation as 
 (Originally published by Cambridge University Press, 1897, based on J. L. Heiberg's Greek version.)
 
 

 
 
 
 
 
 .
 
 .

External links

 
 Online Integral Calculator, Wolfram Alpha.

Online books
 Keisler, H. Jerome, Elementary Calculus: An Approach Using Infinitesimals, University of Wisconsin
 Stroyan, K. D., A Brief Introduction to Infinitesimal Calculus, University of Iowa
 Mauch, Sean, Sean's Applied Math Book, CIT, an online textbook that includes a complete introduction to calculus
 Crowell, Benjamin, Calculus, Fullerton College, an online textbook
 Garrett, Paul, Notes on First-Year Calculus
 Hussain, Faraz, Understanding Calculus, an online textbook
 Johnson, William Woolsey (1909) Elementary Treatise on Integral Calculus, link from HathiTrust.
 Kowalk, W. P., Integration Theory, University of Oldenburg. A new concept to an old problem. Online textbook
 Sloughter, Dan, Difference Equations to Differential Equations, an introduction to calculus
 Numerical Methods of Integration at Holistic Numerical Methods Institute
 P. S. Wang, Evaluation of Definite Integrals by Symbolic Manipulation (1972) — a cookbook of definite integral techniques

 
Functions and mappings
Linear operators in calculus